South Korea participated in the 2010 Summer Youth Olympics in Singapore.

Medalists

Archery

Boys

Girls

Mixed Team

Athletics

Boys
Track and Road Events

Field Events

Girls
Field Events

Badminton 

Boys

Girls

Basketball 

Girls

Fencing

Group Stage

Knock-Out Stage

Field hockey

Gymnastics

Artistic Gymnastics

Boys

Girls

Handball

Judo

Individual

Team

Modern pentathlon

Sailing

Windsurfing

Shooting

Pistol

Rifle

Swimming

Table tennis

Individual

Team

Taekwondo

Triathlon

Girls

Men's

Mixed

Weightlifting

Wrestling

Freestyle

Greco-Roman

References

External links
Competitors List: South Korea

2010 in South Korean sport
Nations at the 2010 Summer Youth Olympics
South Korea at the Youth Olympics